Olmazor is one of 12 districts (tuman) of Tashkent, the capital of Uzbekistan.

Overview
It is a northern district and the most populated of Tashkent. It was established in 1981 as Sobir Rakhimov, referring to the Uzbek general and Hero of the Soviet Union during World War II.

Olmazor borders with the districts of Shayxontoxur and Yunusabad. It borders also with Tashkent Region and is close to the Uzbek frontier with South Kazakhstan Region, in Kazakhstan.

References

External links

Districts of Tashkent
Populated places established in 1981
1981 establishments in the Soviet Union